Lyminster  is a village that is the main settlement of Lyminster and Crossbush civil parish, in the Arun District of West Sussex, England.

Landmarks

Church
The Church of England parish church of St Mary Magdalene is an 11th-century Saxon building and a Grade I listed building, the highest grading in the national system. 
Bells
The church has a ring of six bells. Lester and Pack of the Whitechapel Bell Foundry cast the treble, second and fourth bells in 1759. John Warner and Sons of Cripplegate, London cast the third and fifth bells in 1887, the year of the Golden Jubilee of Queen Victoria. Mears and Stainbank of the Whitechapel Bell Foundry cast the tenor bell in 1950.

Pub
Lyminster has a large pub, The Six Bells.
Crossbush has a large Beefeater (restaurant) on the corner of Crossbush Lane.

History
According to the Hagiography of the Secgan Manuscript the village is the burial place of Saint Cuthflæd of Lyminster.

Folklore
Just to the north of the village is a knuckerhole which, according to legend, was home to a dragon, the Knucker. The church contains a tombstone called the Slayer's Slab, supposed to be from the tomb of the dragonslayer.

References

Sources and further reading

External links

Corpus of Romanesque Sculpture; Lyminster church

Arun District
Villages in West Sussex